Ancistragrostis is a genus of Australian and New Guinean plants in the family Poaceae.

The only known species is Ancistragrostis uncinioides, native to Queensland and Papua New Guinea.

See also
List of Poaceae genera

References

Pooideae
Monotypic Poaceae genera